= Kyontawa =

Kyontawa may refer to:

- Kyontawa, a fictional language and tribe appearing in the 2007 sci-fi short film Food for the Gods.
- Kyontawa, Ayeyarwady, Myanmar, a population centre in Myanmar (Burma).
