= Kyontawa, Myanmar =

Human settlement in Myanmar

17°03′N 95°14′E

Kyontawa is a populated area in Ayeyarwady Division, Myanmar (also known as Burma).
